Mahewa  is a village in Etawah district, in the Uttar Pradesh State, this was the first block of Independent India in 1950 with the name of Agrami Vikas Yojana by General lord Mayor, and a pea processing plant was established here with the help of the USA government. This village also played a significant role in the time of the freedom struggle, when Mahewa came to the Lakhana Estate. After the Independence the Pilot workshop manufactured or supplied agricultural equipment in all over India and SAARC Nations.

There is a big pond of lotus in the middle of the village called mahapatra of British time is in front of a mango garden. Due to that pond and the beauty of lotus, the district collector of Etawah came to this village during British time and there was a very famous cave (GUFA) in village Bhawanipur in ancient time.

There is very old temple of Ram Janki, that was made by the landlord of Mahewa, Pt Guru Narayan Chaube in 1912 before the independence of India.

Mahewa Block
Mahewa Block ( Kshetra Panchayat ) is one of the largest block in India with 92 Gram Panchayat and 106 members of Block called Block Dovelopement candidate, Mahewa is largerst block in all Etawah district's block.

Government Services
There is only one National Bank i.e. State Bank of India and the IFSC Code: SBIN0002572 and Contact number is this 05680-20018 and two State level Bank one "Gramin Bank, Mahewa" other-one "co-operative bank, Mahewa", Post Office of Mahewa Provide the postal service and banking service to increase the savings of families, One Samudayik swasthya kendra ( Government Hospital ) [To many prathmik swasthya kendra (primary hospital) attached form Mahewa samudayik swasthya kendra such as Lakhna, Aheripur, Bakewar, chakarnagar, Hanumantpur, etc.], Animal Hospital Elablished in 1978 for the care of animal in this region. Rashtriya Gramodyog to improving the participation of women in the cotton industry mainly work on the pattern of khadi gram udyog scheme started by Mahatma Gandhi.

Education
Government aided Lokmanya Rural Inter College offering education from 6th class to 12th Class and for girls education mahadevi kanya pathshala inter college and Sanskrit mahavidyalaya offer traditional education.

Sansad Adarsh Gram Yojana
Former Member of parliament Ashok Kumar Doharey choose Mahewa for the programme Sansad Adarsh Gram Yojana. The programme was launched by the Prime Minister of India, Narendra Modi on the birth anniversary of Jayaprakash Narayan, on 11 October 2014.

Mahewa Panchayat
There are various other villages comes under Mahewa Panchayat
Mahewa
Aanepur
Mukutpur
Bahera
Ujhiyani
Bhawanipur
Gulzar nagar Etc.

Great Hindi poet Gopaldas Saxena 'Neeraj', (popularly known as Gopaldas Neeraj or Niraj or Neeraj) was born in Puravali near Mahewa town on 4 January 1924, and he died on July 19, 2018 at the age of 93 years due to lung infection in AIIMS Delhi.

References

Villages in Etawah district